Doña Bárbara (1967–1968) is a Venezuelan telenovela written by Delia Fiallo and based on the 1929 novel written by Rómulo Gallegos. The telenovela was produced by Venevisión. Lupita Ferrer starred as the main protagonist.

Cast
Lupita Ferrer as Doña Bárbara
Esperanza Magaz as Marisela Barquero
Henry Galue as Lorenzo Barquero
José Bardina as Balbino Paiba
Cesar Delgado as Melquíades "El Brujeador"
Carlos Camara Jr. as El Socio
Emperatiz Spanic as Paola Barquero

References

External links
 Doña Bárbara at the Internet Movie Database

1967 telenovelas
1960s Venezuelan television series
1967 Venezuelan television series debuts
1968 Venezuelan television series endings
Venezuelan telenovelas
Spanish-language telenovelas
Television shows set in Venezuela